The Royal Order of Monisaraphon was founded by King Sisowath of Cambodia on 1 February 1905. It is conferred for accomplishment and outstanding support in the fields of education, arts, science, literacy, or social works.

History
The Order of Monisaraphon (or Muni Isvarabarna): founded by King Sisowath of Cambodia on 1 February 1905 (first statutes issued 18 April 1905) and awarded in a single class limited to Cambodians, French protected subjects and other Asians. Reformed by King Norodom Sihanouk on 9 September 1948 and extended to three classes. Extended again to five classes in 1961. Awarded for services in the fields of literature and the fine arts, education, justice, administration, and science. After the Khmer Rouge period, the order was reinstituted by King Norodom Sihanouk by Royal Decree No.1095/01 on 5 October 1995.

Current classes
The five classes of appointment to the Order are, in descending order of precedence:
  Maha Sirivaddha (មហាសេរីវឌ្ឍន៍) or Knight Grand Cross (GCM)
  Mahasena (មហាសេនា) or Knight Grand Officer (GOM)
  Dhipadinda (ធិបឌិន្ទ) or Knight Commander (KCM)
  Sena (សេនា) or Knight Officer (OM)
  Assarariddhi (អស្សឫទ្ធិ) or Knight or Chevalier (KM)

Design
The golden badge consists of a wreath of palm leaves and (left) and laurel leaves (right) with berries, with enclosed in the center a fan in front of two smaller sprays holding a goblet on which rests the closed book of a scholar. Badge reverse is the inversion of the obverse. The Ribbon colour is golden yellow. Measuring 67mm in length and 54mm in width.

Post-Nominals
The senior ranks of Knight Grand Cross entitle their members to use the title as post-nominal GCM; Knight Grand Officer, GOM; Knight Commander, KCM.
The lower ranks of Knight Officer use the post-nominal OM; and Knight, KM. Members of all classes of the order are assigned positions in the order of precedence.

Recipients

See also
Cambodian honours system
Royal Order of Sahametrei

References

External links
 Indochina Medals, THE ORDERS AND MEDALS OF THE KINGDOM OF CAMBODIA
 Medals of the World, Kingdom of Cambodia: Royal Order of Moniseraphon

Orders, decorations, and medals of Cambodia
Awards established in 1905
1905 establishments in French Indochina